The Hilton Anaheim is a hotel located in Anaheim, California, next to the Anaheim Convention Center. It originally opened as the Anaheim Hilton and Towers in 1984, in time for The Los Angeles Olympic Games. Hilton Anaheim is the largest hotel in Orange County and the second-largest hotel in all of Southern California with 1,572 guestrooms. The hotel is near the Disneyland Resort and the Anaheim GardenWalk.

References

Anaheim
Hotels in California
Hotels established in 1984
Hotel buildings completed in 1984
1984 establishments in California
Buildings and structures in Anaheim, California